Al-Nuwaiseeb is a district in the Ahmadi Governorate of Kuwait. The district itself is located at the southern border of Saudi Arabia. Al-Nuwaiseeb has a total population of 537. On June 22, 2021, the local weather station recorded 53.2 °C. It was the hottest temperature recorded ever in the Middle East. Al-Nuwaiseeb borders the Persian Gulf and Saudi Arabia.

Weblinks

References 

Districts of Al Ahmadi Governorate